See You Around, Sam (1996) is a children's novel written by Lois Lowry and illustrated by Diane de Groat. It is part of a series of books that Lowry wrote about Anastasia and her younger brother, Sam.

Summary 
Sam Krupnik is excited to have a new pair of plastic fangs, but his "fangphobic" mother won't allow him to wear them in the house. Angry at her, Sam is determined to run away to Sleetmute, Alaska and live with the walruses: since walruses have fangs, they won't mind Sam's fangs, either. He wants to say goodbye to all his neighbors before leaving, and goes to visit their homes one by one. By the end of the day, though, Sam realizes he doesn't know the way to Alaska, and decides to return home.

Reception 
Kirkus Reviews described the book as a "delight", praising Lowry's "powerfully sympathetic writing" and de Groat's illustrations.

References

External links 
Description of the book from Lowry's website.

1996 American novels
1996 children's books
American children's novels
Novels by Lois Lowry
Houghton Mifflin books